The Eastlake Farmers Co-Operative Elevator Company is a grain elevator in Thornton, Colorado. The building was built in 1920, and is currently vacant. The elevator is an excellent example of a timber-frame, rural grain elevator that stands in stark contrast to the encroaching suburbs around the area.

The building is locally significant as an embodiment of High Plains architecture and reflects the transition between rail and truck transportation, as well as the shifts from single-grain to multiple-grain storage in rural Adams County, Colorado. It is also a fine example of the studded elevator construction technique, a response to the introduction of standardized lumber in the 20th century.

The property was listed on the National Register of Historic Places in 2010.

See also 

 National Register of Historic Place listings in Adams County, Colorado

References 

Grain elevators in the United States
National Register of Historic Places in Adams County, Colorado
1920 establishments in Colorado
Buildings and structures in Adams County, Colorado